On 14 July 2017 Abdel-Rahman Shaaban, a former university student from the Nile Delta region, swam from a public beach to each of two resort hotel beaches at Hurghada on the Red Sea and stabbed five German, one Armenian and one Czech tourists, all women, killing two German women. The Czech tourist died on July 27. The perpetrator shouted that the Egyptian hotel personnel who gave pursuit after the stabbings at the second beach should "Stay back, I am not after Egyptians".  Nevertheless, hotel personnel pursued and captured the attacker.

Background
In the similar 2016 Hurghada attack, foreign tourists were attacked on a beach at Hurghada by sympathizers of the Islamic State in Syria.

The attacks at this Red Sea beach resort are part of a long series of attacks and threats that have crippled the Egyptian tourist trade, a vital part of the Egyptian economy.

Attack
On 14 July 2017 a lone male swam from a public beach to the beach of a  Zahabia Hotel tourist resort on the Red Sea in Hurghada, Egypt and attacked seven foreign tourists, identified as five Germans, a Czech and an Armenian. Two of the German women were killed. The perpetrator then swam to nearby El Palacio beach resort hotel where he attacked two more German women. The Czech woman died on 27 July in a hospital in Cairo due to her severe injuries.

The perpetrator, a man described as in his 20s wearing a black T-shirt and jeans, shouted in Arabic that he was not attacking Egyptians and was heard to shout "you infidels" as he stabbed his victims on the second beach.

Perpetrator
The attacker, 29-year-old Abdel-Rahman Shaaban, spoke to his victims in fluent German before stabbing them.  He is from  Kafr el-Sheikh province in the Nile Delta, and a graduate of the local branch campus of the Al-Azhar University, which has been accused of doctrinal rigidity and political extremism.

Deutsche Welle reports that according to "a source close to the investigation perpetrator "communicated with [the self-proclaimed "Islamic State" (IS) group] via internet and was given the task of attacking foreign tourists on Hurghada beaches" by the extremist militia."

Reactions
On 28 July 2017, the Czech Republic asked Egypt to announce more details of what happened in the attack and to consider compensating the victims families.

See also
 Terrorism in Egypt
 Islamic terrorism

References

Attacks on hotels in Africa
Attacks on tourists
Hurghada
Islamic terrorist incidents in 2017
July 2017 crimes in Africa
July 2017 events in Egypt
Red Sea Governorate
Sinai insurgency
Terrorist incidents in Egypt in 2017
Stabbing attacks in 2017
Knife attacks
Terrorist incidents involving knife attacks